The Harvard Negotiation Project is a project created at Harvard University which deals with issues of negotiations and conflict resolution.

The stated aims and goal of the project, according to the Harvard Law School site is as follows:

The director of the project as of 2008 is Professor James Sebenius.

The program was initiated in 1979, at the time of the commencement of activities the joint heads of the project were William Ury and Roger Fisher.

The project published a text titled Getting to Yes in 1981. Getting It DONE: How to Lead When You're Not in Charge was published in 1998, Difficult Conversations: How to Discuss What Matters Most in 1999, and Beyond Reason: Using Emotions as you Negotiate was published in 2006.

The project at some time identified four crucial factors for negotiation: people, interests, options and criteria (otherwise known as boundary conditions).

The activities of the project include: theory building, education and training, publications and a conflict clinic.

See also
 Program on Negotiation
 Roger Fisher
 Vicente Blanco Gaspar

References

External links
Klaus Winkler - Negotiations with Asymmetrical Distribution of Power: Conclusions from Dispute Resolution in Network Industries published by Springer Science & Business Media, 12 Oct 2006

Legal organizations based in the United States